Jefford Point is a point formed by a rock cliff surmounted by ice, located  east-northeast of Cape Foster on the south coast of James Ross Island, Antarctica. The point was first surveyed by the Swedish Antarctic Expedition, 1901–04, under Otto Nordenskjold. It was resurveyed by the Falkland Islands Dependencies Survey (FIDS) in 1948; the records being lost in a fire at Hope Bay, it was surveyed again by FIDS in 1952. It was named by the UK Antarctic Place-Names Committee for Brian Jefford, a FIDS surveyor at Hope Bay in 1948, and at Admiralty Bay in 1949.

References

Headlands of James Ross Island